Imam Hossein Metro Station is a station in Tehran, Metro Line 2. It is located in Imam Hossein Square, the junctions of Ayatollah Madani Avenue, and Enghelab Street. It is between Shahid Madani Metro Station and Darvaze Shemiran Metro Station along Line 2. The station is also located along Line 6, north of Meydan-e Shohada Metro Station. This Station is 23 meters underground and it has elevators.

References

Tehran Metro stations